Gastrochilus, abbreviated Gchls in horticultural trade, is a genus of plant in family Orchidaceae. It is native to eastern and southeastern Asia, including China, Japan, Bangladesh, Thailand, Malaysia, Indonesia, the Philippines, etc.

Species
Species currently accepted (June 2014):

 Gastrochilus acaulis   (Lindl.) Kuntze
 Gastrochilus acinacifolius   Z.H.Tsi 
 Gastrochilus acutifolius   (Lindl.) Kuntze 
 Gastrochilus affinis   (King & Pantl.) Schltr. 
 Gastrochilus alatus X.H.Jin & S.C.Chen
 Gastrochilus arunachalensis   A.N.Rao 
 Gastrochilus bellinus   (Rchb.f.) Kuntze 
 Gastrochilus brevifimbriatus S.R.Yi
 Gastrochilus calceolaris  (Buch.-Ham. ex Sm.) D.Don 
 Gastrochilus carnosus  Z.H. Tsi 
 Gastrochilus ciliaris  Maek. 
 Gastrochilus corymbosus  A.P. Das & Chanda 
 Gastrochilus dasypogon  (Sm.) Kuntze 
 Gastrochilus distichus  (Lindl.) Kuntze 
 Gastrochilus fargesii (Kraenzl.) Schltr
 Gastrochilus flabelliformis  (Blatt. & McCann) C.J. Saldanha  
 Gastrochilus fargesii  (Kraenzl.) Schltr. 
 Gastrochilus formosanus  (Hayata) Hayata 
 Gastrochilus garhwalensis  Z.H. Tsi 
 Gastrochilus gongshanensis  Z.H. Tsi 
 Gastrochilus guangtungensis  Z.H. Tsi 
 Gastrochilus hainanensis  Z.H. Tsi 
 Gastrochilus hoii  T.P. Lin 
 Gastrochilus inconspicuus  (Hook.f.) Kuntze 
 Gastrochilus intermedius  (Griff. ex Lindl.) Kuntze 
 Gastrochilus japonicus (Makino) Schltr.  
 Gastrochilus kadooriei Kumar, S.W.Gale, Kocyan, G.A.Fisch. & Aver.  
 Gastrochilus linii Ormerod
 Gastrochilus linearifolius Z.H.Tsi & Garay 
 Gastrochilus malipoensis X.H.Jin & S.C.Chen
 Gastrochilus matsudae  Hayata 
 Gastrochilus matsuran  (Makino) Schltr. 
 Gastrochilus minutiflorus  Aver. 
 Gastrochilus nanchuanensis  Z.H. Tsi 
 Gastrochilus nanus  Z.H. Tsi 
 Gastrochilus obliquus  (Lindl.) Kuntze 
 Gastrochilus patinatus  (Ridl.) Schltr.
 Gastrochilus pechei  (Rchb.f.) Kuntze 
 Gastrochilus platycalcaratus  (Rolfe) Schltr. 
 Gastrochilus pseudodistichus  (King & Pantl.) Schltr. 
 Gastrochilus puncticulatus  Cavestro 
 Gastrochilus rantabunensis  C. Chow ex T.P. Lin 
 Gastrochilus raraensis  Fukuy. 
 Gastrochilus rutilans  Seidenf. 
 Gastrochilus saccatus  Z.H. Tsi 
 Gastrochilus sessanicus  A.N. Rao 
 Gastrochilus simplicilabius  Aver. 
 Gastrochilus sinensis  Z.H. Tsi 
 Gastrochilus somae (Hayata) Hayata
 Gastrochilus sonamii  Lucksom 
 Gastrochilus sororius  Schltr. 
 Gastrochilus subpapillosus  Z.H. Tsi 
 Gastrochilus sukhakulii  Seidenf. 
 Gastrochilus sumatranus  J.J. Sm. 
 Gastrochilus sutepensis  (Rolfe ex Downie) Seidenf. & Smitinand 
 Gastrochilus toramanus  (Makino) Schltr. 
 Gastrochilus xuanenensis  Z.H. Tsi 
 Gastrochilus yunnanensis  Schltr.

References

  Prodromus Florae Nepalensis 32. (1825)
  (Eds) (2014) Genera Orchidacearum Volume 6: Epidendroideae (Part 3); page 188 ff., Oxford: Oxford University Press.

External links

 
Vandeae genera
Taxonomy articles created by Polbot